City to Surf may refer to:
City2Surf (Sydney), a road race held in Sydney, Australia
City to Surf (Perth), a road race held in Perth, Australia